Dongkamukam (IPA: ˌdɒŋəˈməʊkəm ) is a town and a town area committee in West Karbi Anglong district in the state of Assam, India.

Etymology
Dong in Karbi language mean shallow water or river. Kam mean step(verb)/crossing. Donkamukam can be translated as To cross the shallow water.

Demographics
Demographically, Dongkamukam town is around 95% Karbi tribe population. Maximum of the non-Karbis have settled here for business purpose and accommodated themselves in rented houses or leased land. The maximum number of Karbis profess the indigenous animism religion who worship the unknown and unseen power. A small population have embraced Christianity and they mainly reside in the village of Bordongka, Taralangso, Sojong,Ghilani and Dongkasarpo. A small percentage of the population are from Bengali, Manipuri,Assamese and Bihari speaking community.
There's a Municipal Board head by the Chairman to look after the all-round development of the town. For better administration, the town is divided into five wards; each headed by a commissioner.
For recreational and sports activities there is a park for children named after Late Khorsing Bey, near the main junction. There's also an indoor stadium for badminton and table tennis. A football stadium for football players. A well-equipped gym for health lovers.

Economy
Dongkamukam is one of the most important towns in West Karbi Anglong. It provides facilities like good schools, colleges, jobs, etc. and is a place of tourist attraction. People from different parts of Karbi Anglong come here in search of a job or for their education or for commercial purposes as Dongkamukam is the only town in West Karbi Anglong which is in a plain area and has all the facilities. It is an important town of West Karbi Anglong and it connects important towns like Hamren, Baithalangso, Kheroni, Zirikindeng, etc.

Education

Schools and colleges
Dongkamukam is listed as one of the best places for quality educational facilities in West Karbi Anglong. The schools and colleges of Dongkamukam also provides a wide range of facilities; like Computers, Library, Campuses, playground etc.

Some of the major Schools and Colleges are:
 Artukekang English High School
 Don Bosco Higher Secondary School, Sojong
 Dongkamukam High School, Charali
 Habe-Kong English High School, Langhan
 Holy Child Home Academy, Ghilani
 Langtuk Teron Memorial School, Tengkeralangso
 Rangsina College
 Sing Mirjeng Long Mirjeng Academy, Daily Bazaar
 Voso Koida English School, Phankri Arong
 Sar-ik Terang Memorial School, Charali
Dongka Sarpo Junior College, Langsudo

Sports

Stadium
Waisong Stadium (Affiliated to Karbi Anglong Sports Association) 
Artukekang Playground
Rongbin FC Playground, Langhan
Langsudo Playground
DBHS School Playground, Sojong

Sports Club
Under West Karbi Anglong Sports Association
Artukekang 4H Club
Waisong Club
Rongbin FC, Langhan
Lightning Club
Hell Angels

Medical & Hospital
30 bedded Rural Hospital
Kramsa Clinic
Niramoy Pharmacy

References

West Karbi Anglong district
Cities and towns in West Karbi Anglong district